Hurlbut Memorial Gate is a monumental structure,  long,  high, and  in depth, at the entry way to Water Works Park located at East Jefferson Avenue and Cadillac Boulevard in a historic area of Detroit, Michigan. It is named after Chauncey (sometimes "Chauncy") Hurlbut, a 19th-century Detroit grocer, president of the Board of Water Commissioners, and philanthropist. The gate was designated a Michigan State Historic Site in 1974 and listed on the National Register of Historic Places in 1975. The monument was built in 1894 and fully restored in 2007.

History
The city of Detroit began building its water system as early as 1824, with the construction of a waterworks at the foot of Orleans. The prosperity of the city in the time after the Civil War allowed Detroit to develop a municipal water system, using water from the Detroit River. In 1868, the city began developing Water Works Park, on Jefferson Avenue near at the foot of Cadillac Boulevard. The main function of the site was to provide water to the municipal system, but it was also intended to use the grounds to be used as a public park. By 1879, the pumping station was completed, and by 1900, the  park had become the second most-used park in the city. Early French settlers planted twelve missionary pear trees "named for the twelve Apostles" on the grounds of what is now Water Works Park. Water Works Park was named Gladwin Park in 1910 in honor of Major Henry Gladwin during Siege of Fort Detroit from Pontiac's Rebellion; however, the park is still more widely known as Water Works Park.

Chauncey Hurlbut

Chauncey Hurlbut (1803–1885) was born in Oneida, New York, and moved to Detroit in 1825. He worked as a saddler and harnessmaker for a few years, then went into the grocery business with his brother-in-law. In 1837, Hurlbut bought out the grocery store, and continued in the trade until his death. Hurlbut was also heavily involved in public service, serving on the board of the fire department, as a city alderman, as a director of the Detroit Board of Trade, and as a sewer commissioner. Hurlbut also served on the Detroit Board of Water Commissioners from 1861 to 1863, and again from 1868 to 1885. He was president of the commission from 1871 onward, when he presided over the original acquisition of property for and planning of Water Works Park.

When Chauncey Hurlbut died in 1885, he willed the bulk of his fortune, some $250,000, to beautify Water Works Park. The architectural philosophies of the era called for construction of monumental gates at the entrances to public places, to symbolically separate the park from the hustle and filth of the city. Part of Hurlbut's fortune was used to construct just such a gate.

Description

Herman A. Brede and Gustave Mueller were chosen to design this gate at a cost of $30,000. It is decorated with carved garlands, water fonts and roundels, and an American eagle with outstretched wings tops the entire structure. Two stairways lead to a terrace twelve feet above the ground.

The gate originally featured a statue of Chauncey Hurlbut inside the center dome, and an ornamental iron gate for vehicle entry, but both are now gone. The gate was substantially restored in 2007, with damaged limestone repaired or replaced, a stairway reconfiguration, repair of the eagle sculpture, and repair and replacement of light fixtures.

References

Further reading

National Register of Historic Places in Detroit
Beaux-Arts architecture in Michigan
Infrastructure completed in 1894
Michigan State Historic Sites
Monuments and memorials in Michigan
Tourist attractions in Detroit
1894 sculptures
Stone sculptures in Michigan
1894 establishments in Michigan
Limestone sculptures in the United States